Vasil S. Tole (born 22 November 1963) is an Albanian composer, ethnomusicologist and administrator. A proponent of European classical music, his compositions include opera, chamber music, orchestral works and various pieces for small ensembles and solo instruments. He is the author of several books, mostly about the music of Albania. He has also researched about Aromanian music.

Tole is currently a professor at the Academy of Arts in Tirana, Albania. He is also the head of the Department for Cultural Heritage in Albania's Ministry of Culture; president of the National Music Council of Albania and a member of the International Music Council.

Career 
He was graduated for composition at the Faculty of Music, at the Academy of Arts, in Tirana, in 1987, at the class of Prof. Kozma Lara. After working for three years as the artistic director at “Shtëpia e Kulturës” (“House of Culture”), in his hometown, Përmet, in 1991, he was appointed as a professor of the Albanian Music Folklore at the Faculty of Music, at the Academy of Arts, in Tirana, and then as a professor of Composition. It is here where he presents his PhD dissertation in 1994, in the field of ethnomusicology with the study: “Structure and Semantics in the Instrumental Folk Music of Southern Albania”. 

In 1994-95, he carried out the post-graduate studies in the field of Composition at Folkwang Hochschule, Essen-Germany, in the class of Prof. Wolfgang Hufschmidit and, in 1996, he carried out the postdoctoral studies in the Department of Musicology at the University of Athens, Greece. In 2000, he received the scientific title “Associate Professor”, and the one of “Professor” in 2004. 

As an active representative of the new generation of the Albanian composers, Vasil S. Tole is known as one of the main protagonists of change, an initiator of new creative alternatives, one of the most decisive supporters of the concept for the restructuring of the Albanian folk music subject, serving to the identification of the identity and the novelties in contemporary music. Simultaneously, he dedicates himself to a broad activity related to studies and journalism, and participates in numerous music contests, conferences and roundtables in Albania, Kosovo, Greece, Italy, Czech Republic, Austria, Germany, Spain, England, Netherlands, Bulgaria, Canada, USA, China etc. He cooperates with artistic and research newspapers and magazines, with the Albanian Radio and Television; he is the author of tens of journalistic writings and monographies on music, as well as the winner of some important awards at national and international level, such as the winner of the first prize in composition “Dimitris Mitropoulos”, Athens 2001, with the opera “Eumenidet”. 

After the 1990s, along with some colleagues, at the Academy of Arts, he becomes the initiator of the foundation and the management of some important music organisms, such as: the association “Muzikës së Re Shqiptare” (1993); the Albanian section of “The Rilm Abstract Literature of Music”, New York (1995); the Albanian section of CIOFF-it (1996); he has been the chairman of the Albanian Music Council since 1995, a member of the National Council of Music, Paris, a member of SEM-USA, Gema-Germany etc. 

From 1997 to 1999, he was the Director of the National Theatre of Opera and Ballet. From 2001-2007, he was the Director of the Cultural Heritage Directorate at the Ministry of Tourism, Culture, Youth and Sports. In 2005, he met all the obligations as an expert of ethnomusicology to prepare the file of the Albanian folk iso-polyphony, proclaimed by UNESCO as a “Masterpiece of Oral Heritage of Humanity”. In 2008, he was elected as a member of the Academy of Sciences of the Republic of Albania, in 2013, as a scientific secretary and in 2019 as the Deputy Chairperson of the Academy of Sciences of Albania.

References

External links
 Prof. Dr. Vasil S. Tole's website (in English and Albanian).

21st-century classical composers
Albanian composers
1963 births
Living people
Male classical composers
Musicians from Tirana
21st-century male musicians